Younis Mubarak Obaid Al Mahaijri (born 12 March 1987), commonly known as Younis Mubarak, is an Omani footballer who plays for Al-Oruba SC.

Club career
On 7 July 2014, he signed a one-year contract extension with Al-Oruba SC.

Club career statistics

International career
Younis was part of the first team squad of the Oman national football team till 2008. He was selected for the national team for the first time in 2006. He has made appearances in the 2007 AFC Asian Cup and the 2010 FIFA World Cup qualification.

References

External links
 
 
 Younis Mubarak Al-Mahaijri at Goal.com
 
 

1987 births
Living people
Omani footballers
Oman international footballers
Association football midfielders
2007 AFC Asian Cup players
Al-Orouba SC players
Sur SC players
Al-Nahda Club (Oman) players
Oman Professional League players
People from Sur, Oman